The AN/SPS-49 is a United States Navy two-dimensional, long range air search radar built by Raytheon that can provide contact bearing and range. It is a primary air-search radar for numerous ships in the U.S. fleet and in Spain, Poland, Taiwan aboard s, Canada on its  (prior to FELEX mid-life upgrade) and New Zealand on its s. It formerly served in a complementary role aboard Aegis cruisers with the AN/SPY-1 but the systems are currently being removed during routine upgrade with no replacement.

Operation
The orange-peel parabolic shape of the antenna creates a narrow 3.3°-beam to reduce the probability of detection or jamming. It can rotate at 6  rpm in long range mode or 12 rpm in short-range mode. Default is at 12 rpm for the AN/SPS-49A(V)1, to provide more frequent scans against incoming missiles. The SPS-49A(V)1 can detect out to its full range at either 6 or 12 rpm. The antenna is stabilised to compensate for ships pitch and roll, to a maximum of +/-15° for both pitch and roll in 12 rpm mode, and +/-23.5° for both pitch and roll in 6 rpm mode. The output stage of the transmitter in all variants uses a two-cavity klystron amplifier. 
In 1998, the Inspector General of the Department of Defense reported that SPS-40 and SPS-49 radars in Bahrain were "unusable because the equipment operates on a frequency that interferes with the Bahrain telecommunications services".

On board ships

United States

Italy

Australia

Canada

New Zealand 

 Te Kaha-class frigate (Replaced with SMART-S as part of the FSU programme in the early 2020s)

South Korea

Variants
As of 2014, there are eleven configurations of the AN/SPS-49(V).
 AN/SPS-49(V)1: Baseline radar (Various CVN, LHA, LSD and other ships)
 AN/SPS-49(V)2: (V)1 radar without the coherent  side  lobe  cancellation feature (s)
 AN/SPS-49(V)3: (V)1 radar with the radar video  processor  (RVP)  interface (FC-1)
 AN/SPS-49(V)4: (V)2  with  the  RVP interface (s)
 AN/SPS-49(V)5: (V)1 with automatic target  detection  (ATD) (New Threat Upgrade (NTU) ships)
 AN/SPS-49(V)6: (V)3 system with double shielded cables and a modified cooling system 
 AN/SPS-49(V)7: (V)5 system with a (V)6 cooling system (Aegis combat system)
 AN/SPS-49(V)8: (V)5 system enhanced to include the AEGIS Tracker modification kit (Aegis combat system)
 AN/SPS-49(V)8 ANZ: (V)8 system modified to interface with the CelsiusTech 9LV-453 combat system (s)
 AN/SPS-49(V)9: (V)5 with medium PRF upgrade  (MPU)
 AN/SPS-49A(V)1: Developed in the mid-1990s. Added radial speed determination on each target, each scan. Improved clutter rejection

See also
 List of radars

References

External links 
 Electronics Technician Volume 4-Radar Systems - via Tpub

Raytheon Company products
Sea radars
Military radars of the United States
Military electronics of the United States